Sheepbridge railway station was a station in Chesterfield, Derbyshire, England.

It was built by the Midland Railway in 1870 on what is known to railwaymen as the "New Road" to Sheffield. This bypassed the North Midland Railway's  original line, which had avoided Sheffield due to the gradients involved and came to be known as the "Old Road".

Between 1897 and 1957 it was known as Sheepbridge and Whittington Moor. It was only used for passengers, goods being dealt with at a depot on a nearby branch. The platforms were built over the highway, with timber waiting rooms without canopies. The brick built booking office was at road level on Station Road with footpaths to the platforms, the  up line to London was accessed via the  footpath under the station bridge . It was closed in 1967. The booking office building still exists and is currently in use as a television repair shop.

After leaving Chesterfield the line diverged at Tapton Junction, Sheepbridge marking the beginning of the long 1 in 100 climb through Broomhouse Tunnel to Unstone

References

Disused railway stations in Derbyshire
History of Derbyshire
Railway stations in Great Britain opened in 1870
Railway stations in Great Britain closed in 1967
Buildings and structures in Chesterfield, Derbyshire
Former Midland Railway stations
Beeching closures in England